Henry Frederick Thynne, 3rd Marquess of Bath (24 May 1797 – 24 June 1837), styled Lord Henry Thynne until January 1837 and Viscount Weymouth between January and March 1837, was a British naval commander and politician.

Background
Thynne was the second son of Thomas Thynne, 2nd Marquess of Bath, whom he succeeded in March 1837 (his unmarried elder brother Thomas had predeceased their father by two months). He inherited land in County Monaghan, Shropshire, Somerset and Wiltshire.

Military and political careers
He was educated at Eton College. He then served in the Royal Navy and rose to the rank of captain in 1822 after which he transferred to the Signals Corps and did not return to sea. From 1824 to 1826 and 1828 to 1832, he was MP (Tory) for Weobley, Herefordshire.

Family
Lord Bath married the Honourable Harriet Baring, daughter of Alexander Baring, 1st Baron Ashburton, on 19 April 1830. They had four children:

Lady Louisa Isabella Harriet Thynne (1834 – 26 June 1919); married 1862 General Hon. Sir Percy Feilding, son of William Feilding, 7th Earl of Denbigh and had issue.
Lady Alice Thynne (d. 1847)
John Alexander Thynne, 4th Marquess of Bath (1831–1896)
Lord Henry Frederick Thynne (1832–1904); married Lady Ulrica Seymour, daughter of Edward Seymour, 12th Duke of Somerset and had issue.

Death
Lord Bath died suddenly in 1837, having been Marquess for only three months, and was buried on 1 July 1837 at Longbridge Deverill, near his home, Longleat House in Wiltshire. He was succeeded by his eldest son John.

References

External links

1797 births
1837 deaths
People educated at Eton College
3
Henry
Royal Navy officers
Members of the Parliament of the United Kingdom for English constituencies
UK MPs 1820–1826
UK MPs 1826–1830
UK MPs 1830–1831
UK MPs 1831–1832
Tory MPs (pre-1834)